Fiorenzo Marini (14 March 1914 – 25 January 1991) was an Italian fencer. He won a silver medal in the team épée event at the 1948 Summer Olympics and a gold in the same event at the 1960 Summer Olympics.

References

External links
 

1914 births
1991 deaths
Italian male fencers
Olympic fencers of Italy
Fencers at the 1948 Summer Olympics
Fencers at the 1960 Summer Olympics
Olympic gold medalists for Italy
Olympic silver medalists for Italy
Olympic medalists in fencing
Fencers from Vienna
Medalists at the 1948 Summer Olympics
Medalists at the 1960 Summer Olympics